The 1952 Indiana gubernatorial election was held on November 4, 1952. Republican nominee George N. Craig defeated Democratic nominee John A. Watkins with 55.68% of the vote. Craig and Handley became the first gubernatorial ticket in Indiana history to receive more than one million votes.

General election

Candidates
Major party candidates
George N. Craig, Republican, National Commander of The American Legion
John A. Watkins, Democratic, Lieutenant Governor under Henry F. Schricker

Other candidates
Lester N. Abel, Prohibition
Samuel Boorda, Progressive
Charles Ginsberg, Socialist Labor

Results

References

1952
Indiana
Gubernatorial